Vareja ( or ) is a settlement in the Haloze Hills above the right bank of the Deavinja River in the Municipality of Videm in eastern Slovenia. The area traditionally belonged to the Styria region. It is now included in the Drava Statistical Region.

References

External links
Vareja on Geopedia

Populated places in the Municipality of Videm